Julian Thoby Stephen (9 September 1880 – 20 November 1906), known as the Goth, was the brother of Vanessa Bell and Virginia Woolf, both prominent members of the Bloomsbury Group, and of Adrian Stephen.

Thoby Stephen was the eldest son of Leslie Stephen and Julia Prinsep Stephen. The result of his mother's second marriage, he was therefore a half-brother of George and Gerald Duckworth, her sons with first husband Herbert Duckworth.

Stephen was educated at Clifton College, after failing to gain a place at Eton. However, this did not hold him back, since he won an exhibition to Trinity College, Cambridge, from Clifton. He was a friend of Lytton Strachey, who was enchanted by his masculinity and introduced him to the "Reading Club". He was described as "over six feet tall and of somewhat ponderous build".

Stephen is credited with starting the Bloomsbury Group's Thursday evening gatherings.

He was expected to distinguish himself, but he contracted typhoid at the age of 26 while on holiday in Greece, and died shortly after he was brought back to England. He is buried in Highgate Cemetery with his father and mother.

Vanessa Bell's eldest son, the poet Julian Bell, was named after him.

He is the basis for the character of Tibby Schlegel in E.M. Forster's 1910 novel Howards End. Virginia Woolf's 1931 novel The Waves is considered by some critics to make significant reference to Thoby Stephen.

Notes

References
Lytton Strachey: The New Biography by Michael Holroyd (1994) 
 Charleston Farmhouse

People educated at Clifton College
Alumni of Trinity College, Cambridge
1880 births
1906 deaths
Burials at Highgate Cemetery
Stephen-Bell family
Virginia Woolf
Deaths from typhoid fever
19th-century male writers